John Tully may refer to:

 CCGS John P. Tully, a vessel in the Canadian Coast Guard
 Jack Tully (1885–1966), Australian politician
 John A. Tully (born 1947), author and academic at Victoria University, Melbourne
 John C. Tully (born 1942), American theoretical chemist
 John Tully (American football) (born 1952), college football coach
 John Tully (Irish politician) (1904–1977), Irish Clann na Poblachta politician
 John Tully (architect), Canadian architect

Tully, John